Medininkai Castle, a medieval castle  in Vilnius district, Lithuania, was built in the first half of the 14th century. The defensive perimeter of the castle was 6.5 ha; it is the largest enclosure type castle in Lithuania.  It was built on plain ground and was designed for flank defence. The rectangular castle's yard covered approximately 1.8 hectares and was protected by walls 15 metres high and 2 metres thick. The castle had 4 gates and towers. The main tower (donjon), about 30 metres high, was used for residential quarters. Medininkai was first mentioned in 1392. The castle was badly damaged by a major fire in the late 15th century. Because of increased use of firearms, this type of castle was no longer suited for defensive purposes and was later used as a residence. During the 17th–18th centuries it was reorganized into a farm and a bakery. After the castle's restoration, its museum currently exhibits large collection of items made from silver by artisans of the Grand Duchy of Lithuania, and collection of hunting trophies and hunting knives of President Algirdas Brazauskas.

Gallery

See also
Castles in Lithuania

References

External links

 Medininkai Castle description
 Medininkai Castle Photos by Lithuanian Photograph
The Association of Castles and Museums around the Baltic Sea

Buildings and structures completed in the 13th century
Castles in Lithuania
Brick Gothic
Buildings and structures in Vilnius County
Museums in Vilnius County
Castles of the Grand Duchy of Lithuania